Eyholz railway station is a railway station in the municipality of Visp, in the Swiss canton of Valais. It is an intermediate stop on the  Brig–Zermatt line and is served by local trains only.

Services 
The following services stop at Eyholz:

 Regio:

References

External links 
 

Railway stations in the canton of Valais
Matterhorn Gotthard Bahn stations